Cicero (originally known as Hawthorne) is a suburb of Chicago and an incorporated town in Cook County, Illinois, United States. Per the 2020 census, the population was 85,268. making it the 11th largest municipality in Illinois. The town of Cicero is named after Marcus Tullius Cicero, a Roman statesman and orator.

History
Originally, Cicero Township occupied an area six times the size of its current territory. The cities of Oak Park and Berwyn were incorporated from portions of Cicero Township, and other portions, such as Austin, were annexed into the city of Chicago.

Famous pilots like Hans-Joachim Buddecke, Lincoln Beachey, Chance M. Vought and others flew from there at various times during the "pioneer era" of aviation in the United States shortly before the nation's involvement in World War I, before the field closed in mid-April 1916.

Al Capone built his criminal empire in Chicago before moving to Cicero to escape the reach of Chicago police. The 1924 Cicero municipal elections were particularly violent due to gang-related efforts to secure a favorable election result.

On July 11–12, 1951, a race riot erupted in Cicero when a white mob of around 4,000 attacked and burned an apartment building at 6139 W. 19th Street that housed the African-American family of Harvey Clark Jr., a Chicago Transit Authority bus driver who had relocated to the all-white city. Governor Adlai E. Stevenson was forced to call out the Illinois National Guard. The Clarks moved away and the building had to be boarded up. The Cicero riot received worldwide condemnation.

Cicero was taken up and abandoned several times as site for a civil rights march in the mid-1960s. Cicero had a sundown town policy prohibiting African Americans from living in the city. The American Friends Service Committee, Martin Luther King Jr., and many affiliated organizations, including churches, were conducting marches against housing and school de facto segregation and inequality in Chicago and several suburbs, but the leaders feared too violent a response in Chicago Lawn and Cicero. Eventually, a substantial march (met by catcalls, flying bottles and bricks) was conducted in Chicago Lawn, but only a splinter group, led by Jesse Jackson, marched in Cicero. The marches in the Chicago suburbs helped galvanize support for the passage of the Civil Rights Act of 1968, extending federal prohibitions against discrimination to private housing. The act also created the United States Department of Housing and Urban Development's Office of Fair Housing and Equal Opportunity, which enforces the law.

The 1980s and 1990s saw a heavy influx of Hispanic (mostly Mexican and Central American) residents to Cicero. Once considered mainly a Czech or Bohemian town, most of the European-style restaurants and shops on 22nd Street (now Cermak Road) have been replaced by Spanish-titled businesses. In addition, Cicero has a small black community.

Cicero has seen a revival in its commercial sector, with many new mini-malls and large retail stores. New condominiums are also being built in the city.

Cicero has long had a reputation of government scandal. By 2002, Republican Town President Betty Loren-Maltese was sent to federal prison in California, for misappropriating $12 million in funds.

Geography
Cicero formerly ran from Harlem Avenue to Western Avenue and Pershing Road to North Avenue; however, much of this area was annexed by Chicago.

Landmarks

St. Mary of Czestochowa, a Neo-Gothic church built in the Polish Cathedral style along with the sculpture of Christ the King by famed sculptor Professor Czesław Dźwigaj, who also cast the monumental bronze doors at St. Hyacinth's Basilica in Chicago. The church's other claim to fame is as the site of Al Capone's sister Mafalda's wedding in 1930.
J. Sterling Morton High School, East Campus, also known as Morton East High School, was built in 1894. The original school was destroyed by fire in 1924, and the current building was constructed. Located at 2423 S. Austin Blvd, Morton East serves residents of Cicero.
Chodl Auditorium, located inside Morton East High School, was built in 1924 (completed 1927) to replace the 1,200-seat auditorium which was destroyed by fire. The auditorium was originally a dual-purpose room, serving as a gymnasium for students, and was originally built for this purpose. In 1967 the school stopped using the auditorium as a gymnasium. Chodl Auditorium is among the largest non-commercial proscenium theatres in the Chicago Metropolitan Area and is listed with the National Register of Historic Places.
Hawthorne Works Tower, one of the original towers of the enormous Western Electric manufacturing plant that once stood east of Cicero Avenue, is still located behind the Hawthorne Works Shopping Center near the corner of Cermak Road (22nd Street) and Cicero Avenue.
Chicagoland Sports Hall of Fame.

Racetracks

On the south side of Cicero, there were two racetracks. Hawthorne Race Course, located in Cicero and Stickney, is a horse racing track still in operation.  Just north of it was Chicago Motor Speedway at Sportsman's Park, which was formerly Sportsman's Park Racetrack (for horse racing) for many years.  This Sportsman's Park facility is now closed, acquired by the Town of Cicero, and has since been demolished. Facilities of the Wirtz Beverage Group have been built on the west half and a Walmart built on the east half.

Climate

Demographics
As of the 2020 census there were 85,268 people, 22,698 households, and 17,508 families residing in the town. The racial makeup of the town was 19.22% White, 3.72% African American, 4.26% Native American, 0.59% Asian, 0.04% Pacific Islander, 46.86% from other races, and 25.30% from two or more races. Hispanic or Latino of any race were 89.00% of the population.

There were 22,698 households, out of which 83.62% had children under the age of 18 living with them, 47.83% were married couples living together, 19.60% had a female householder with no husband present, and 22.87% were non-families. 18.99% of all households were made up of individuals, and 5.63% had someone living alone who was 65 years of age or older. The average household size was 4.06 and the average family size was 3.55.

The town's age distribution consisted of 28.0% under the age of 18, 12.3% from 18 to 24, 28.2% from 25 to 44, 23.2% from 45 to 64, and 8.5% who were 65 years of age or older. The median age was 31.7 years. For every 100 females, there were 96.9 males. For every 100 females age 18 and over, there were 98.9 males.

The median income for a household in the town was $53,726, and the median income for a family was $56,632. Males had a median income of $33,835 versus $26,101 for females. The per capita income for the town was $20,040. About 11.4% of families and 13.8% of the population were below the poverty line, including 18.3% of those under age 18 and 15.3% of those age 65 or over.

Note: the US Census treats Hispanic/Latino as an ethnic category. This table excludes Latinos from the racial categories and assigns them to a separate category. Hispanics/Latinos can be of any race.

As of 2011, 52.5% of occupied housing units were owned properties, and 47.5% were rentals. There were 4,667 vacant housing units. The average age of home properties was greater than 66 years.

Cicero is a factory town. As of 1999, about a quarter of the city contained one of the greatest industrial concentrations in the world.

Government
Most of Cicero is in Illinois's 4th congressional district; the area south of the railroad at approximately 33rd Street is in the 3rd district.

The United States Postal Service operates the Cicero Post Office at 2440 South Laramie Avenue.

Education
Cicero is served by Cicero Elementary School District 99 and comprises 16 schools, making it one of the largest public school districts outside of Chicago. Elementary students attend the following schools, depending on residency: Burnham (K-6), Cicero East (4-6), Cicero West (PK-4), Columbus East (4-6), Columbus West (PK-4), Drexel (K-6), Early Childhood Center (PK), Goodwin (PK-6), Liberty (K-3), Lincoln (PK-6), Roosevelt (5-6), Sherlock (PK-6), Warren Park (PK-6), Wilson (K-6), and Unity Junior High (7-8), which is separated into East/West sections. East side being held for eighth graders & seventh graders on the West side. Unity is the second largest middle school in the country. High school students entering their freshman year attend the Freshman Center and then continue high school at Morton East of the J. Sterling Morton High School District 201. The McKinley Educational Center serves as an alternative school for 5th-8th graders and the Morton Alternative School serves as an alternative school for 9th-12th graders

The Roman Catholic Archdiocese of Chicago operates two PK-8 schools in Cicero:
 Our Lady of Charity School
 St. Frances of Rome School

From 1927 until 1972, Cicero was the home of Timothy Christian School.

Cicero is also home to Morton College.

Infrastructure

Transportation

Cicero is served by two major railroad lines, the BNSF Railway and the Belt Line Railroad. Public Transportation is provided by Metra BNSF Railway Line between Aurora and Chicago's Union Station with a stop at the Cicero station near Cicero Avenue and 26th Street. Currently, this station is undergoing a much needed reconstruction and expansion by Metra. Also, the CTA Pink Line provides daily service from the  terminal to the Loop. Its  station is also located in Cicero. Multiple Pace and CTA bus routes cover portions of Cicero.

Fire department
Cicero is served by the Cicero Fire Department (CFD), with a staff of 68 professional firefighters and 24 paramedics. The CFD operates out of three fire stations.

Notable people
 Felix Biestek (1912–1994), American priest and professor
 Al Capone (1899-1947), American gangster and businessman and the co-founder and boss of the Chicago Outfit.
 JoBe Cerny (born 1947), an actor from Cicero, is the voice of the Pillsbury Doughboy.
 Joe Mantegna (born 1947), Tony award-winning actor, also writer and director.
 Erika Sánchez (1983/1984), American poet and writer

In popular culture

In the show “Chicago PD” Cicero is the hometown of the main character Sargent Hank Voight. 
In the HBO series Boardwalk Empire, Cicero is the home of Al Capone. Many of the episode plots are based in Cicero.
Cicero is mentioned as the hometown of Jimmy McGill/Saul Goodman and his brother Chuck McGill in Better Call Saul.
In the musical Chicago Velma Kelly mentions Cicero in the number "Cell Block Tango" as the location of the hotel where she murdered her husband Charlie and sister Veronica.
In Walker Percy's novel Love in the Ruins, the schismatic American Catholic church establishes Cicero, Illinois as its "new Rome."
In Bertolt Brecht's The Resistible Rise of Arturo Ui, Cicero is annexed by Chicago, as a satirical allegory for the Nazi annexation of Austria.
In Guys and Dolls, the Chicago-area gangster "Big Julie" claims to be from "East Cicero, Illinois" (and pronounces the final "s" on Illinois).
In the 1948 film noir Sorry, Wrong Number, the story takes place in New York City but in flash-backs recounted by several characters we learn that the story actually begins in Chicago and Cicero.  The female character Leona Cotterel (Barbara Stanwyck) is the rich, spoiled daughter of the owner of a pharmaceutical company located in Cicero.  She lives with her father in a Chicago mansion.  A few years later, after she marries, the story moves to Bayonne, New Jersey, and ends in Manhattan and Staten Island.
Al Bundy from the show Married with Children mentions that he gets his hair cut in Cicero.
In Guns Under the Counter, on The Fiery Furnaces' album Rehearsing My Choir, Cicero is mentioned in the line "In Cicero, Never stand at a window".

References

External links

This American Life episode about Cicero, released 3/16/01
Extensive historical coverage of gang activity and racial issues in Cicero

 
1867 establishments in Illinois
Chicago metropolitan area
Populated places established in 1867
Towns in Cook County, Illinois
Towns in Illinois
Sundown towns in Illinois
Majority-minority cities and towns in Cook County, Illinois